The Europe Zone was one of the three regional zones of the 1960 Davis Cup.

28 teams entered the Europe Zone, with the winner going on to compete in the Inter-Zonal Zone against the winners of the America Zone and Eastern Zone. Italy defeated Sweden in the final and progressed to the Inter-Zonal Zone.

Draw

First round

Hungary vs. Ireland

Luxembourg v Monaco

Israel vs. Chile

Switzerland vs. Belgium

Norway vs. Netherlands

Finland vs. Argentina

Denmark vs. Yugoslavia

Egypt vs. Austria

West Germany vs. Czechoslovakia

Romania vs. Poland

Sweden vs. South Africa

Second round

Hungary vs. Italy

Monaco vs. Chile

Belgium vs. Brazil

Netherlands vs. Great Britain

France vs. Argentina

Austria vs. Denmark

Poland vs. West Germany

Sweden vs. Spain

Quarterfinals

Italy vs. Chile

Great Britain vs. Belgium

France vs. Denmark

West Germany vs. Sweden

Semifinals

Great Britain vs. Italy

Sweden vs. France

Final

Sweden vs. Italy

References

External links
Davis Cup official website

Davis Cup Europe/Africa Zone
Europe Zone
Davis Cup